John Preston Young (1847–1934) was an American Confederate veteran, judge and historian.

Early life
John Preston Young was born on April 18, 1847 in Chulahoma, Mississippi. His father, Reverend A. W. Young, was a Presbyterian minister. Young was of Scotch-Irish and French descent on his paternal side. He moved to Memphis, Tennessee with his family at the age of twelve.

Young attended the University of Mississippi in Oxford, Mississippi. In 1864, in the midst of the American Civil War, Young joined the Confederate States Army, serving under General Nathan Bedford Forrest. After the war, he returned to Ole Miss and graduated.

Career
Young became a lawyer in Memphis, Tennessee in 1872. He served as a judge on the Circuit Court from 1902 to 1923.

Young was a member of the Confederate Historical Association, later known as the West Tennessee Historical Society. He was elected as the vice president for West Tennessee of the Tennessee Historical Society in 1915.

Young was the author of The Seventh Tennessee Cavalry (Confederate): A History, Reminiscences of the Civil War, Standard History of Memphis, etc.

Young's article entitled Hood's Failure at Spring Hill was published in the January 1908 issue of the Confederate Veteran, "the most in demand of any published after the turn of the century, probably because of Judge Young's sixteen-page article and battle map regarding that controversial subject."

Personal life
Young had two sons, Garnett Young and Frazier Young, and a daughter, Lucy Young.

Death
Young died on June 6, 1934 in Memphis, Tennessee.

References

1847 births
1934 deaths
American people of French descent
American people of Scotch-Irish descent
People from Marshall County, Mississippi
Writers from Memphis, Tennessee
University of Mississippi alumni
Confederate States Army officers
Circuit court judges in the United States
19th-century American historians
19th-century American male writers
Writers from Tennessee
American male non-fiction writers